Cooper Industries, Inc. v. Leatherman Tool Group, Inc., 532 U.S. 424 (2001), was a decision by the United States Supreme Court involving the standard of review that Federal Appeal Courts should use when examining punitive damages awards.

Prior history
Leatherman Tool Group made a multifunction tool that was arguably uniquely new at the time of its introduction.  In 1995, Cooper Industries, a competing toolmaker, decided to enter the same market niche with a similar tool.  The competing product was originally to be nearly identical to the original, save a few cosmetic changes.  When introducing the new tool at the 1996 National Hardware Show, the advertising materials, catalogs, and a mock-up were, in fact, modified versions of the original Leatherman tool.

After the trade show, Leatherman Tool Group filed a civil suit against Cooper Industries asserting claims of trade-dress infringement, unfair competition, and false advertising  under the Lanham Act and a common-law claim of unfair competition for advertising and selling an imitation.  In October 1997, a federal jury returned a verdict against Cooper Industries on the false advertising, imitation, and unfair competition claims and assessed damages.  It awarded Leatherman Tool Group $50,000.00 in compensatory damages and $4.5 Million in punitive damages.  The Ninth Circuit Court of Appeals affirmed the punitive damages on appeal, stating that the damages were not "grossly excessive" under BMW of North America, Inc. v. Gore .

Case
The case was argued on February 26, 2001.  Cooper Industries asked the Court to decide whether the Court of Appeals reviewed the constitutionality of the punitive damages award under the correct standard.  

Because the Court itself has recognized that determining if a fine is grossly excessive is "inherently imprecise" Gore held that it was necessary to evaluate a number of factors.  

The degree of the defendant's reprehensibility or culpability
The relationship between the penalty and the harm to the victim caused by the defendant's actions
The sanctions imposed in other cases for comparable misconduct

The Appeals Court has the responsibility on appeal of determining if the lower District court had evaluated these factors correctly.  Instead of merely deciding whether the lower court had abused its judicial discretion, the punitive damages should be reviewed in their entirety.  By doing so, the Appeals courts would ensure that the courts in its circuit applied these standards in a uniform manner and that citizens would receive uniform treatment.

Effects of the decision
In making its decision, the Court extended the holding in Furman v. Georgia  that the Eighth Amendment applied to the states through the Fourteenth Amendment.  While Furman confirmed the earlier incorporation of the 8th Amendment's Cruel and Unusual Punishment clause in Robinson v. California, 370 U.S. 660, 667 (1962)  Cooper Industries v. Leatherman Tool Group incorporated the Excessive Fines clause.

The Court later seemed to back away from this holding.  Justice Stevens' Opinion for the Court directly stated: "...the Fourteenth Amendment's Due Process Clause imposes substantive limits on the States' discretion, making the Eighth Amendment's prohibition against excessive fines and cruel and unusual punishments applicable to the States."  Nine years later, however, in a footnote to his Opinion for the Court in McDonald v. City of Chicago, Justice Alito wrote: "We never have decided whether the Third Amendment or the Eighth Amendment’s prohibition of excessive fines applies to the States through the Due Process Clause."  The discrepancy between these two views was resolved in Timbs v. Indiana, wherein the Court unanimously ruled that the Eighth Amendment's prohibition of excessive fines is an incorporated protection applicable to the states under the Fourteenth Amendment.

Subsequent history
On remand to the Ninth Circuit, applying the de novo review standard the Appeals court reduced the punitive damages to $500,000.00. [citation: http://www.ca9.uscourts.gov/coa/newopinions.nsf/970AC2B13F32751B88256BAE00575CFB/$file/9835147.pdf?openelement]

See also
 List of United States Supreme Court cases, volume 532
 List of United States Supreme Court cases

External links
 

United States Supreme Court cases
United States trademark case law
United States civil procedure case law
United States civil due process case law
2001 in United States case law
United States Supreme Court cases of the Rehnquist Court